Uta, Uda in Sardinian language, is a comune (municipality) of the Cagliari metropolitan area in the Metropolitan City of Cagliari in the Italian region Sardinia, located about  northwest of Cagliari.  The main attraction is the Romanesque church of Santa Maria. In the area near Monte Arcosu were found also some Nuragic bronzes, in 1849. According to 2015 census, it has 8,392 inhabitants.

Uta borders the following municipalities: Assemini, Capoterra, Decimomannu, Siliqua, Villaspeciosa.

References

External links

 Official website

Cities and towns in Sardinia